Hugo Flink (16 August 1879 – 2 May 1947) was an Austrian stage and film actor. Flink was one of the earliest actors to play Sherlock Holmes on screen.

Flink was born in Vienna and died in Berlin.

Selected filmography
 The Onyx Head (1917)
 Let There Be Light (1917)
 The Salamander Ruby (1918)
 Out of the Depths (1919)
 Catherine the Great (1920)
 The Love of a Thief (1920)
 Princess Woronzoff (1920)
 Va banque (1920)
 The Dance of Love and Happiness (1921)
 The Black Spider (1921)
 The Love Nest (1922)
 The Sensational Trial (1923)
 The Stolen Professor (1924)
 Love and Trumpets (1925)
 Children of No Importance (1926)
 People to Each Other (1926)
 Mademoiselle Josette, My Woman (1926)
 Bismarck 1862–1898 (1927)
 Two Under the Stars (1927)
 Lord of the Night (1927)
 The Gypsy Chief (1929)
 Crime Reporter Holm (1932)
 1914 (1931)
 The Secret of Johann Orth (1932)
 Things Are Getting Better Already (1932)
 The Eleven Schill Officers (1932)
 Waltz War (1933)
 Little Man, What Now? (1933)
 A Woman With Power of Attorney (1934)
 Last Stop (1935)
 Don't Lose Heart, Suzanne! (1935)
 If It Were Not for Music (1935)
 My Life for Maria Isabella (1935)
 Family Parade (1936)
 The Impossible Woman (1936)
 Fridericus (1937)
 Crooks in Tails (1937)
 The Scoundrel (1939)
 Falstaff in Vienna (1940)
 Die goldene Stadt (1942)
 Romance in a Minor Key (1943)
 Back Then (1943)
 The Bath in the Barn (1943)

Bibliography

External links

1879 births
1947 deaths
Austrian male stage actors
Austrian male film actors
Austrian male silent film actors
Male actors from Vienna
20th-century Austrian male actors